Tamisha Iman is the stage name of Will Crawford, an American drag queen most known for competing on the thirteenth season of RuPaul's Drag Race and winning several drag pageants. She is a drag matriarch and the founder of the Iman Dynasty, a drag house.

Early life 
Crawford was born in Birmingham, Alabama.

Career 
Tamisha Iman is a drag performer who was cast for season 13 of RuPaul's Drag Race. She had originally been selected to compete in season 12, but had to cancel in order to receive radiation therapy for colon cancer. She competed at the age of 49, wearing an ostomy bag. Tamisha Iman was eliminated on the season's sixth episode. Jordan Robledo of Gay Times called her a "standout talent".

Tamisha Iman has competed in many drag pageants and received titles, including Miss Black Universe and Miss GayUSofA. She creates most of her outfits and does her own hair and makeup. Among her drag "children" are Tandi Iman Dupree and fellow Drag Race contestant LaLa Ri. Iman also "adopted" fellow Drag Race contestant Kahmora Hall into her drag family. She has supported approximately 80 "drag children". Tamisha Iman has been described as a "drag veteran" and a "legend".

Personal life 
Crawford lives in Atlanta, and has previously lived in Dallas and New Orleans. He has experienced homelessness. Crawford had three biological children before turning 18, while still in high school. One of his children, Tamisha, is the inspiration for Tamisha Iman's first name.

Filmography

Television

Web series

Awards and nominations

References

External links
 

Living people
American drag queens
LGBT people from Georgia (U.S. state)
Gay entertainers
People from Birmingham, Alabama
People from Atlanta
Tamisha Iman
African-American drag queens
Year of birth missing (living people)